Oliver Gustafsson (born 15 May 1993), sometimes spelled Oliver Gustavsson, is a Swedish footballer who plays for FC Kålltorp as a goalkeeper.

References

External links

Oliver Gustafsson at Fotbolltransfers
Oliver Gustafsson at Lagstatistik

1993 births
Living people
Association football goalkeepers
GAIS players
Torslanda IK players
IFK Göteborg players
Ljungskile SK players
Superettan players
Allsvenskan players
Swedish footballers